Wilfredo Morales (born 17 March 1971) is a Cuban wrestler. He competed at the 1996 Summer Olympics and the 2000 Summer Olympics.

References

External links
 

1971 births
Living people
Cuban male sport wrestlers
Olympic wrestlers of Cuba
Wrestlers at the 1996 Summer Olympics
Wrestlers at the 2000 Summer Olympics
Sportspeople from Havana
Pan American Games medalists in wrestling
Pan American Games gold medalists for Cuba
Pan American Games silver medalists for Cuba
Pan American Games bronze medalists for Cuba
Wrestlers at the 1995 Pan American Games
Wrestlers at the 1999 Pan American Games
Wrestlers at the 2003 Pan American Games
20th-century Cuban people
21st-century Cuban people